Michael Joseph Sampoerna (born August 23, 1978) is the youngest son of the Indonesian Sampoerna family. After working in various positions in Sampoerna, the largest Indonesian tobacco company, he became the president director on June 27, 2001.

References

Indonesian businesspeople
Indonesian people of Chinese descent
Living people
1978 births
Michael Joseph